The 1959 Nippon Professional Baseball season was the tenth season of operation of Nippon Professional Baseball (NPB).

Regular season

Standings

Postseason

Japan Series

League leaders

Central League

Pacific League

Awards
Baseball Hall of Fame
Matsutaro Shoriki
Hiroshi Hiraoka
Yukio Aoi
Shin Hashido
Kiyoshi Oshikawa
Jiro Kuji
Eiji Sawamura
Iso Abe
Most Valuable Player
Motoshi Fujita, Yomiuri Giants (CL)
Tadashi Sugiura, Nankai Hawks (PL)
Rookie of the Year
Takeshi Kuwata, Taiyo Whales (CL)
Isao Harimoto, Toei Flyers (PL)
Eiji Sawamura Award
Minoru Murayama, Osaka Tigers (CL)

See also
1959 Major League Baseball season

References